

Events

July events
 July 25 – George Stephenson puts his first steam locomotive in service, the Blücher for Killingworth Colliery on Tyneside in England.

Births

January births 
 January 21 – Wendel Bollman, American designer of the Bollman Truss Railroad Bridge (d. 1884).
 January 30 – Ferdinand Schichau, German mechanical engineer and founder of locomotive manufacturing company Schichau-Werke, is born (d. 1896).

May births
 May 26 – Wilhelm Engerth, German steam locomotive designer (d. 1884).

September births
 September 11 – John Ramsbottom, superintendent of the Manchester and Birmingham Railway (d. 1897).

Unknown date births
 Andrew Barclay, Scottish steam locomotive builder (d. 1900).

Deaths

References